Gabukay is a rural locality (an aul) and the administrative center of Gabukayskoye Rural Settlement of Teuchezhsky District, the Republic of Adygea, Russia. The population was 1811 as of 2018. There are 17 streets.

Geography 
The aul is located on the left bank of the Pshish River, near the Ryazanskaya stanitsa, 20 km east of Ponezhukay (the district's administrative centre) by road. Ryazanskaya is the nearest rural locality.

Ethnicity 
The aul is inhabited by Circassians.

References 

Rural localities in Teuchezhsky District